Verchild's Peak is a prominent mountain on the island of Saint Kitts in the country of Saint Kitts and Nevis. 

It lies close to the centre of the island, and rises to a height of 900 m (2953 ft).

Mountains of Saint Kitts and Nevis
Saint Kitts (island)